The 1970–71 daytime network television schedule for the three major English-language commercial broadcast networks in the United States covers the weekday and weekend daytime hours from September 1970 to August 1971.

Legend

 New series are highlighted in bold.

Schedule
 All times correspond to U.S. Eastern and Pacific Time scheduling (except for some live sports or events). Except where affiliates slot certain programs outside their network-dictated timeslots, subtract one hour for Central, Mountain, Alaska, and Hawaii-Aleutian times.
 Local schedules may differ, as affiliates have the option to pre-empt or delay network programs. Such scheduling may be limited to preemptions caused by local or national breaking news or weather coverage (which may force stations to tape delay certain programs to other timeslots) and any major sports events scheduled to air in a weekday timeslot (mainly during major holidays). Stations may air shows at other times at their preference.
ABC had a 6PM (ET)/5PM (CT) feed for their newscast, depending on stations' schedule.

Monday-Friday

Saturday

In the Know aired on CBS at 8:55am, 9:55am, 10:55am, 11:55am, and 12:55pm.

Sunday

By network

ABC

Returning series
ABC Evening News
All My Children
American Bandstand
Bewitched 
The Bullwinkle Show 
Cattanooga Cats 
Dark Shadows
The Dating Game
Discovery
General Hospital
The Hardy Boys 
Hot Wheels
Issues and Answers
Jonny Quest 
Let's Make a Deal
Motormouse
The Newlywed Game
One Life to Live
Skyhawks
The Smokey Bear Show
That Girl 
A World Apart

New series
Here Come the Double Deckers
Lancelot Link, Secret Chimp
Love, American Style 
Password
The Reluctant Dragon & Mr. Toad Show
Will the Real Jerry Lewis Please Sit Down

Not returning from 1969-70
The Adventures of Gulliver 
The Best of Everything
Dream House
The Dudley Do-Right Show
Fantastic Four 
Fantastic Voyage 
George of the Jungle 
Get it Together
The Hardy Boys
The New Casper Cartoon Show
Spider-Man

CBS

Returning series
Archie's Funhouse
As the World Turns
The Beverly Hillbillies 
The Bugs Bunny/Road Runner Hour
Camera Three
Captain Kangaroo
CBS Evening News
CBS Morning News
Dastardly and Muttley in Their Flying Machines 
The Edge of Night
Face the Nation
Gomer Pyle, USMC 
The Guiding Light
The Jetsons 
Lamp Unto My Feet
Look Up and Live
Love Is a Many Splendored Thing
Love of Life
The Lucy Show 
The Monkees 
The Perils of Penelope Pitstop 
Scooby-Doo, Where Are You!
Search for Tomorrow
The Secret Storm
Sunrise Semester
Tom and Jerry 
Where the Heart Is

New series
Family Affair 
Groovie Goolies
Harlem Globetrotters
Josie and the Pussycats
Sabrina the Teenage Witch

Not returning from 1969-70
The Adventures of Batman 
The Andy Griffith Show 
The New Adventures of Superman
Ted Mack's Amateur Hour
Wacky Races

NBC

Returning series
Another World
Bright Promise
Concentration
Days of Our Lives
Dinah's Place
The Doctors
H.R. Pufnstuf 
The Heckle and Jeckle Cartoon Show
Here Comes the Grump  
Hollywood Squares
Jambo
Jeopardy!
Meet the Press
NBC Nightly News
NBC Saturday Night News
NBC Sunday Night News
The Pink Panther Show
Sale of the Century
Somerset
Today
The Who, What, or Where Game
The Woody Woodpecker Show 

New series
The Bugaloos
The Further Adventures of Dr. Dolittle
Hot Dog
Joe Garagiola's Memory Game
Three on a Match
The Tomfoolery Show
Words and Music

Not returning from 1969-70
The Banana Splits Adventure Hour
The Flintstones
Frontiers of Faith
The Huntley-Brinkley Report
It Takes Two
Letters to Laugh-In
Life with Linkletter
Lohman & Barkley's Name Droppers
You're Putting Me On

See also
1970-71 United States network television schedule (prime-time)
1970-71 United States network television schedule (late night)

References
Castleman & Podrazik, The TV Schedule Book, McGraw-Hill Paperbacks, 1984.

United States weekday network television schedules
1970 in American television
1971 in American television